Luo Xi is the name of:

Luo Xi (banker) (born 1960), senior executive vice president of Industrial and Commercial Bank of China
Luo Xi (synchronised swimmer, born 1969), Chinese synchronised swimmer
Luo Xi (synchronised swimmer, born 1987), Chinese synchronised swimmer